Copestylum sexmaculatum, the six-spotted bromeliad fly, is a species of syrphid fly in the family Syrphidae.

References

External links

 

Eristalinae
Articles created by Qbugbot
Insects described in 1819
taxa named by Palisot de Beauvois 
Diptera of North America
Hoverflies of North America